New Dominion may refer to:

Places 
 New Dominion, Nova Scotia, Canada
 Xinjiang, China

Other uses 
 The New Dominion, a Dutch death metal band
 New Dominion Pictures, an American television production company